HMCS Fundy (hull number MCB 159) was a  that was constructed for the Royal Canadian Navy during the Cold War. Entering service in 1956, the vessel was used as a training ship on the West Coast of Canada for the majority of her career. Fundy was decommissioned in 1996 and the fate of the vessel is unknown.

Design and description
The Bay class were designed and ordered as replacements for the Second World War-era minesweepers that the Royal Canadian Navy operated at the time.

They had a complement of 38 officers and ratings.

The Bay-class minesweepers were powered by two GM 12-cylinder diesel engines driving two shafts creating . The ships were armed with one 40 mm Bofors gun and were equipped with minesweeping gear.

Operational history
Ordered as a replacement for sister ship,  which had been transferred to the French Navy in 1954, the ship's keel was laid down on 7 March 1955 by Davie Shipbuilding at their yard in Lauzon, Quebec. Named for a bay located between New Brunswick and Nova Scotia, Fundy was launched on 14 June 1956. The ship was commissioned on 27 November 1956.

After commissioning, the minesweeper was transferred to the West Coast of Canada and joined Training Group Pacific. In 1972, the class was re-designated patrol escorts. The vessel remained a part of the unit until being paid off on 19 December 1996. The ultimate fate of the ship is unknown.

References

Notes

Citations

References
 
 
 
 
 

 

Bay-class minesweepers
Ships built in Quebec
1956 ships
Cold War minesweepers of Canada
Minesweepers of the Royal Canadian Navy